Folketing elections were held in Denmark on 3 January 1879. The Liberals retained their majority, whilst voter turnout was around 47.2%.

Results

References

Denmark
Elections in Denmark
1879 in Denmark
Denmark